The Chevrolet Corvette C8.R is a grand tourer racing car built by Pratt & Miller and Chevrolet for competition in endurance racing. It serves as the replacement for the Corvette C7.R, using the C8 generation Chevrolet Corvette as a base. Corvette Racing fielded the C8.R in the IMSA SportsCar Championship GT Le Mans (GTLM) class starting with the 2020 season. The car was built to LM GTE specifications as per GTLM rules.

In 2022, the GTLM class in the IMSA SportsCar Championship was replaced by the GT Daytona Pro (GTD Pro) class using GT3 machinery. As Corvette did not have any GT3 cars on the market (with the Chevrolet Corvette Z06 GT3.R not debuting until 2024), the C8.R was allowed to run in the GTD Pro class using a GTD kit. This year Corvette Racing would also field a full season entry in the WEC for the first time.

Racing history

2020 
The Corvette C8.R made its competitive debut at the 2020 24 Hours of Daytona. The best of the Corvettes, the no.3, finished 4th in the GTLM class and 16th overall with 785 laps. The second car, no.4, finished the race in last place, after running into multiple issues. Throughout the rest of the season the Corvettes managed to score 6 class victories at Daytona, Sebring, Road America, Virginia, Mid-Ohio and Charlotte Motor Speedway. The #3 corvette would end up taking the Championship. Corvette also made their WEC debut at the 2020 Lone Star Le Mans in the GTE pro class. Initially Corvette also entered the 2020 24 Hours of Le Mans, but had to withdraw due to the COVID-19 pandemic.

2021 
At the beginning of the 2021 Corvette took a class victory in the 2021 24 Hours of Daytona. They also won their class at 6 other races, with the only opposition coming from Weathertech Racing and BMW. Corvette also returned to the WEC with a single entry at the 6 hours of Spa. This year also saw the C8.R's debut at the 24 hours of Le Mans, with the #64 Corvette managing to take 2nd place in class not far behind the winning Ferrari.

2022 
For 2022 Corvette entered only one car for the IMSA Weathertech Sportscar championship, their other car entering full season in the 2022 FIA World Endurance Championship in the GTE Pro class. For IMSA the team developed a GTD kit, as the GTLM class had been replaced by GTD Pro. For the first race at Daytona the Corvettes faced a lot of reliability issues and BoP issues, meaning it wasn't very competitive. The squad however, quickly bounced back to win at Sebring, but would fail to earn a second trip to victory lane for the rest of the season. Eventually, the team settled for third in the final championship standings, behind the Pfaff Motorsports Porsche and Vasser-Sullivan's Lexus.

The FIA WEC half of the operation would earn a victory at Monza, and would place second at Sebring (separate from the 12 Hour-enduro IMSA race they won) and at Bahrain, but the Tommy Milner-Nick Tandy piloted entry was routinely outpaced by AF Corse's Ferrari and Porsche's factory effort. As a result, the two Corvette wheelmen wound up tied for sixth in the final points table.

2023 
For 2023, Corvette Racing are expected to continue with its modified C8.R in GTD Pro. Jordan Taylor and Antonio Garcia will drive at all events, with Tommy Milner joining them in the endurance rounds.

With the GTE-Pro class being eliminated for the 2023 FIA World Endurance Championship. Corvette's squad will move to GTE-Am. As a result of having to alter its driver lineup to meet the class regulations, Platinum-rated Nicky Catsburg will lead the squad, joined by Ben Keating, a Bronze-level driver, while the team is seeking a Silver-rated pilot to fulfill the remainder of the GTE-Am class requirements.

Race Victories

References

External links
Corvette Racing 

C8.R
Grand tourer racing cars
24 Hours of Le Mans race cars
LM GTE cars